The Piasecki VZ-8 Airgeep (company designation PA-59) was a prototype vertical takeoff and landing (VTOL) aircraft developed by Piasecki Aircraft. The Airgeep was developed to fulfill a U.S. Army Transportation Research Command contract for a flying jeep in 1957. The flying jeep was envisioned to be smaller and easier to fly than a helicopter.

Design and development

To meet the US Army's requirement, Piasecki's design featured two tandem, three-blade ducted rotors, with the crew of two seated between the two rotors.  Power was by two  Lycoming O-360-A2A piston engines, driving the rotors by a central gearbox. The first of two aircraft ordered by the Army, initially designated the Model 59K Skycar (and later renamed Airgeep) by Piasecki and designated VZ-8P by the Army, flew on 22 September 1958.

It was re-engined with a single  Turbomeca Artouste IIB turboshaft replacing the two piston engines, flying in this form in June 1959.  After being loaned to the U.S. Navy for evaluation as the Model 59N where it was fitted with floats, it was returned to the Army and its engine replaced by a lighter and more powerful  Garrett AiResearch TPE331-6 engine.

The second prototype was completed to a modified design, designated Model 59H AirGeep II by Piasecki and VZ-8P (B) by the Army. It was powered by two Artouste engines, with ejection seats for the pilot and co-pilot/gunner and a further three seats for passengers.  It was also fitted with a powered tricycle undercarriage to increase mobility on land.

The AirGeep II's first flight occurred on 15 February 1962, piloted by "Tommy" Atkins.

While the Airgeep would normally operate close to the ground, it was capable of flying to several thousand feet, proving to be stable in flight. Flying low allowed it to evade detection by radar. Despite these qualities, and its superiority over the other two types evaluated by the US Army to meet the same requirement (the Chrysler VZ-6 and the Curtiss-Wright VZ-7), the Army decided that the "Flying Jeep concept [was] unsuitable for the modern battlefield", and concentrated on the development of conventional helicopters instead.

Variants

Model 59K Skycar Company designation for the first aircraft powered by two ) Lycoming O-360-A2A piston engines, given the military designation VZ-8P Airgeep. Later, the piston engines were replaced by a single ) Turbomeca Artouste IIB turboshaft engine.
Model 59N SeaGeep I The first aircraft, (after the piston engines were replaced by a single Artouste), whilst on loan to the United States Navy, fitted with floats.
PA-59H AirGeep II The second aircraft, military designation VZ-8P (B), completed with two ) Turbomeca Artouste IIC turboshaft engines and seats for up to five, including the crew.
VZ-8P Airgeep I The military designation of the first aircraft as delivered
VZ-8P-1 Airgeep IThe first aircraft after the piston engines were replaced by a single  Turbomeca Artouste IIB.
VZ-8P-2 Airgeep I The first aircraft after the Artouste engine was replaced by a lighter and more powerful ) Garrett AiResearch TPE331-6 engine.
VZ-8P (B) Airgeep IIThe military designation of the second aircraft.

Specifications (VZ-8P (B))

See also

References

Notes

Bibliography
Harding, Stephen. "Flying Jeeps: The US Army's Search for the Ultimate 'Vehicle'". Air Enthusiast, No. 73, January/February 1998. Stamford, Lincs, UK:Key Publishing. . pp. 10–12.

Piasecki Tests Twin-Turbine and Seagoing VTOLs. // Aviation Week & Space Technology, May 7, 1962, v. 76, no. 19, p. 83.

External links

 Piasecki Aircraft Corporation

VZ-8
1950s United States military utility aircraft
Cancelled military aircraft projects of the United States
Lift fan
Ducted fan-powered aircraft
Twin-turbine helicopters
Aircraft first flown in 1962